Michael or Mike Gorman may refer to:
Michael Gorman (musician) (1895–1970), Irish traditional fiddler
Michael Gorman (librarian) (born 1941), British-born librarian
Michael Gorman (Wisconsin politician) (1816–1899), Irish-born Wisconsin politician
Michael A. Gorman (1950–2012), modern politician in North Carolina
Mike Gorman (born 1945), American basketball player and sports commentator
Michael J. Gorman (born 1955), New Testament scholar